Lleyton Hewitt defeated Xavier Malisse 6–4, 6–7(2–7), 6–1 to win the 1999 Citrix Tennis Championships singles event. Andrew Ilie was the champion but did not defend his title.

Seeds

  Vincent Spadea (first round)
  Sébastien Grosjean (semifinals)
  Scott Draper (semifinals)
  Magnus Norman (second round)
  Magnus Larsson (quarterfinals)
  Lleyton Hewitt (champion)
  Mark Woodforde (first round)
  Justin Gimelstob (second round)

Draw

Finals

Top half

Bottom half

External links
 Singles draw

Singles
Delray Beach Open
1999 Citrix Tennis Championships